Galyon is a surname. Notable people with the surname include:

Nicolle Galyon (born 1984), American country music singer, songwriter, and record producer
Ronnie and Donnie Galyon (1951–2020), American conjoined twins
Scott Galyon (born 1974), American football player